Satirical ostraca are a category of ostraca (singular: an ostracon) that represent the real world in unrealistic, impossible situations–a satire. The common example portrayed which helped create this categorization, are animals which take reversed roles, for example a vertically–walking cat, with ducks on the end of leashes. The same role reversals can be seen on satirical papyri. This concept is a prevalent feature in absurdist literature, such as in the works of Mikhail Bulgakov.

References

External links

"Cat and Mouse Ostracon", with 'role inversion'. Click on picture. This is a "Figured", cartoon-like, limestone ostracon.
Examples
Cat & Mouse-2
Cat, Mouse-(Magistrate), & Young-Boy-(with Sidelock); Article

Ostracon
Greek satire
Egyptian satire
Satire